is a Japanese manga series written and illustrated by Yū Suzunoki. It is serialized in Weekly Morning magazine published by Kodansha since July 26, 2012. It has 27 volumes compiling the chapters released as of July 2019. The manga won Best General Manga at the 40th Kodansha Manga Awards. Kodansha USA have licensed the manga for a North American digital release as Kounodori: Dr. Stork.

A TV drama adaptation, officially titled Dr. Storks (stylized as Dr.STOЯKS) in English, aired on the Tokyo Broadcasting System from October 16 to December 18, 2015. It was followed by a second series from October 13 to December 21, 2017.

In March 2020, it was announced that Kounodori: Dr. Stork entered its final arc. The manga finished on May 7, 2020.

Characters

Sakura Kōnodori (played by Go Ayano)
Kae Shimoya (played by Mayu Matsuoka)
Rumiko Komatsu (played by Yo Yoshida)
Ryo Shirakawa (played by Kentaro Sakaguchi)
Mayumi Kadota (played by Nana Seino)
Hiroshi Kase (played by Yusuke Hirayama)
Takuya Funakoshi (played by Akinaga Toyomoto)
Director Osawa (played by Kazuyuki Asano)
Sachiko Mukai (played by Noriko Eguchi)
Megumi Arai (played by Sayaka Yamaguchi)
Haruki Shinomiya (played by Gen Hoshino)
Takayuki Imahashi (played by Nao Omori)
Hiroyuki Nagai (played by Shun Oguri)
Goro Akanishi (played by Hio Miyazawa)

Volumes
1 (June 21, 2013)
2 (September 20, 2013)
3 (December 20, 2013)
4 (March 20, 2014)
5 (June 23, 2014)
6 (September 22, 2014)
7 (December 22, 2014)
8 (March 23, 2015)
9 (June 23, 2015)
10 (September 23, 2015)
11 (October 23, 2015)
12 (November 23, 2015)
13 (March 23, 2016)
14 (June 23, 2016)
15 (September 23, 2016)
16 (December 22, 2016)
17 (March 23, 2017)
18 (June 23, 2017)
19 (September 22, 2017)
20 (October 23, 2017)
21 (November 22, 2017)
22 (May 23, 2018)
23 (June 22, 2018)
24 (September 21, 2018)
25 (December 21, 2018)
26 (March 23, 2019)
27 (June 21, 2019)
28 (September 20, 2019)
29 (December 23, 2019)
30 (March 23, 2020)
31 (June 23, 2020)
32 (October 23, 2020)

Reception
Volume 6 reached the 22nd place on the weekly Oricon manga charts and, as of September 28, 2014, had sold 43,198 copies; volume 7 reached the 31st place and, as of December 28, 2014, had sold 47,885 copies; volume 8 reached the 15th place and, as of March 29, 2015, had sold 48,477 copies.

The manga won Best General Manga at the 40th Kodansha Manga Awards. It was number 35 on the 15th Book of the Year list by Da Vinci magazine in 2014. It was also nominated for Best General Manga at the 39th Kodansha Manga Awards.

References

External links
Kounodori: Dr. Stork on morning.moae.jp 

Drama anime and manga
Kodansha manga
Medical anime and manga
Seinen manga